Shirley Hills may refer to:

 Shirley Hills, Croydon, south London, a wooded area that includes the Addington Hills 
 Shirley Hills Historic District, Macon, Georgia, United States